"10:35" is a song by Dutch DJ Tiësto featuring Canadian singer Tate McRae. It was released on 3 November 2022 through Musical Freedom and Atlantic Records as the sixth single from Tiësto's upcoming seventh studio album Drive.

Background
On 21 October 2022, McRae first teased the song in a TikTok recorded at Atlantis The Royal, Dubai without disclosing any further details on the song. It would later turn out the music video for the song was filmed at the resort, which is scheduled to open in January 2023.

The DJ also pointed out similarities between the core message of the song, a switch "from day to night", and the "dual experience" of the hotel.

Reception
The song was described as a perfect mixture between McRae's "easy vocals" and Tiësto's "rough, bassy drop". Lexi Lane of Uproxx called it a "dance anthem" and highlighted McRae's "crystal-clear vocals", as well as an instrumental that "builds anticipation".

Charts

Weekly charts

Year-end charts

Certifications

References

2022 singles
2022 songs
Atlantic Records singles
Song recordings produced by Ryan Tedder
Songs written by Ryan Tedder
Songs written by Tate McRae
Songs written by Tiësto
Tate McRae songs
Tiësto songs